Boubacar Traoré  may refer to:

Boubacar Traoré (musician) (born 1942), Malian guitarist and singer
Boubacar Traore (runner) (born 1971), Guinean marathon runner and political activist
Boubacar Traoré (basketball) (born 1946), Senegalese basketball player
Boubacar Traoré (footballer, born 1998), Malian footballer for Naft Maysan FC
Boubacar Traoré (footballer, born 1999), Malian footballer for Budapest Honvéd FC
Boubacar Traoré (footballer, born 2001), Malian footballer
Boubacar Traorè (footballer) (born 1997), Senegalese footballer

See also
Traoré